Symmoca longipalpella is a moth in the family Autostichidae. It was described by Rebel in 1914. It is found in Egypt.

References

Moths described in 1914
Symmoca